Alberto Buccicardi, named Arturo Bucciardi by FIFA, (11 May 1914 – 8 December 1970) was a Chilean football player and manager, who coached Chile in the 1950 FIFA World Cup.

Buccicardi played and coached Club Deportivo Universidad Católica in 1940s and 1950s.

References

1914 births
1970 deaths
Chilean footballers
Chilean football managers
Chile national football team managers
Club Deportivo Universidad Católica footballers
Club Deportivo Universidad Católica managers
1950 FIFA World Cup managers
Association footballers not categorized by position